Gegham Grigorian  (also written Grigoryan) (29 January 1951 – 23 March 2016) was an Armenian operatic tenor.

Biography 
Gegham Grigorian was born in Yerevan and graduated from Yerevan Komitas State Conservatory, the class of People's Artist of Armenia professor Sergei Danielyan. Grigorian made his first appearance on the big stage in 1971 at age 20, in 1972 he went to West Berlin to appear with solo concerts.

In 1975 he made his debut at the National Theater of Opera and Ballet of Armenia in the role of Edgardo (opera "Lucia di Lammermoor" by Donizetti). This is followed by Saro (opera "Anush" by Tigranian),  Tirith ("Arshak II" by Chukhajyan),  Sayat Nova ("Sayat-Nova" by Arutiunian), Count Almaviva ("Il Barbiere di Siviglia" by Rossini), and Faust ("Faust" by Gounod).

Travel restrictions 

In the 1970s he was already a famous singer in the then Soviet Union. In 1978 he took part in the competition of the School of Art in Milan at the theater La Scala and was one of the four lucky winners who were invited to qualify for this school. During his traineeship in Italy, he participated in several concerts. In "La Scala" Gegham Grigorian made his debut in the role of Pinkerton (Madama Butterfly by Puccini). After that performance, he signed a contract with the theater "La Scala" for leading roles in the operas "Boris Godunov" and Tosca. The performances were to be conducted by Claudio Abbado, then he was principal conductor of La Scala.

"But politics interfered. The Mussorgsky opera was being staged by Yuri Lyubimov, the famous Moscow director-dissident already in conflict with the government (he was later stripped of his citizenship, in 1984). The production was in rehearsals when the Soviet Union Ministry of Culture asked Grigorian to cancel his participation. As the singer described it at the time - just after the first dress rehearsal - he initially refused. But when the authorities threatened him and his family he acquiesced and departed for Russia. Subsequently he was put on the so-called restricted artists list and not allowed to leave the Soviet Union for eight years" (25 March 2016| by Maya Pritsker, Musicalamerica.com)

As written by The Telegraph on 30 March 2016: "In November that year (1979), however, he turned up in Trieste, some 250 miles east of Milan, seeking political asylum. He was living in a refugee centre while his case was being considered, but within days had vanished, failing to turn up in Milan for his appearance in Mussorgsky’s Boris Godunov on December 7."

In 1980, Virgilijus Noreika, artistic director of Lithuanian National Opera and Ballet Theatre invites Grigorian to work In Vilnius. There Grigorian worked with the famous conductor Jonas Alex. He sang in the operas  "Eugene Onegin", "Don Carlos", "Boris Godunov," "La Traviata," "Madama Butterfly," "Rigoletto" and many others.

Since 1989, at the invitation of Valery Gergiev he joined the Kirov Opera (soon to be the Mariinsky Theater) as the lead singer.

Here Grigorian was a great success. In those years, the Mariinsky Theater just gained fame. Gegham Grigorian made a great contribution in the formation and establishment of a company of soloists,  under the chief conductor and artistic director Valery Gergiev. Until now, in St.Petersburg and throughout Russia, opera fans remember the beautiful and dramatic voice and a magnificent performance of Gegham Grigorian.

After 1990 the Soviet Union was on the verge of collapse, and Grigorian had the opportunity to travel to foreign countries.

Career abroad 

"When he did eventually appear regularly in the West – under the patronage of the conductor Valery Gergiev – he thrilled audiences at Covent Garden, where his portrayal of Lensky in Tchaikovsky's Eugene Onegin was hailed as musical gold by critics, and at the Metropolitan Opera, New York, where he gave a moving account of Herman in The Queen of Spades." The critic Rodney Milnes declared him to be "one of today's great tenors", adding that in "Grigorian's Lensky you hear a century of Russian tenor tradition, inimitably plangent, firm and expressive". After a concert performance of The Queen of Spades with the BBC Philharmonic in Manchester in 2004, The Daily Telegraph noted how Grigorian "invested every fibre of his being in the obsessed Hermann", while earlier The New York Times had declared that in the same role at the Met his "characteristic concentration produced frequent haunting moments". (The Telegraph, 30 MARCH 2016)

The Soviet Union had started to disintegrate and Grigorian was now free to travel again. This stage of career of Grigorian began with debut at the Royal Concertgebouw in Amsterdam in 1990, he sang leading roles in Donizetti’s Lucrezia Borgia, La Boheme and Lecouvreur operas and three years later made his Royal Opera House (London) debut in Eugene Onegin as Lensky. In 1995 he was a last-minute substitute for Luciano Pavarotti in Verdi’s Un Ballo in Maschera at Covent Garden, the same year in which he appeared in New York.

He returned to the Metropolitan Opera in 2002 as Count Bezukhov in Prokofiev’s War and Peace with Dmitri Hvorostovsky and Anna Netrebko, again under Gergiev. Almost 20 years after disappearing from La Scala, Grigorian returned to the Italian opera house in 1998, singing in Mussorgsky’s Khovanshchina alongside Burchuladze under Gergiev, returning there in Verdi’s La Forza del Destino under Riccardo Muti in 1999. In 2000 he returned to Armenia as artistic director of the Yerevan Opera Theatre, a post he held for seven years.

Grigoryan sang at all famous and big Opera Houses and concert halls.
Royal Opera House ("Mazepa", "Eugene Onegin"), Metropolitan Opera ("The Queen of Spades", "Aida", "War and Peace", "Un Ballo in Maschera", "Prince Igor", "Cavalleria Rusticana", "Tosca" ), La Scala ("Madama Butterfly", "La Forza del Destino", "Boris Godunov", "Khovanshchina," "Queen of Spades", "War and Peace"), Teatro Colón Buenos Aires ("Fedora", "Pagliacci", "Il tabarro", "Norma"), Teatro dell'Opera di Roma ("Norma", "Aida", "Un Ballo in Maschera", "La Boheme", etc.), Berlin Staatsoper ("Prince Igor", "Aida", "Il Trovatore", "Queen of Spades").

Grigoryan sang in New York, Washington, Tokyo, Paris, Vienna, Munich, Berlin, Amsterdam, Monte Carlo, Geneva, Florence, Japan, etc.

Since 1990, Grigorian was a regular guest at various festivals: Chorégies d'Orange (Orange, France), at the Summer Opera Season in the Baths of Caracalla (Teatro dell'Opera di Roma, Rome,Italy), Ravenna Festival (Ravenna, Italy), Savonlinna Opera Festival (Savonlinna, Finlyadniya), Maggio Musicale Fiorentino (Florence, Italy), Festival Puccini (Torre del Lago, Italy), Salzburg Festival (Austria), and many others. In the years 1989-96 he was a member of the Committee of the artistic leadership at the Semaines Musicales de Tours Festival (France).
He fulfilled all of the most difficult parts for tenors ("Rigoletto" 208 performances, "Aida" 70 productions). He has worked with all the great singers of the classic genre, who created the history of classical performance of 20th and 21st centuries: Nicolai Ghiaurov, Mirella Freni, Leontyne Price, Grace Bumbry, Gena Dimitrova, Maria Dragoni Luciano Pavarotti, Plácido Domingo, Leo Nucci and Gergiev, Zubin Mehta, James Levine, Bruno Bartoletti,  Yevgenny Svetlanov, Richter. Opera directors: Graham Vick, Konchalovsky, Zeffirelli, Del Monaco, etc.

After ten years of abroad career Gegham Grigorian has been called one of the best tenors of the 20th century, the list of which is headed by the legendary Enrico Caruso, Beniamino Gigli, Franco Corelli.

As artistic director 

In 2000 the President of Armenia Robert Kocharyan invited him to be the artistic director of the Yerevan Opera Theater. He directed the theater in that position until 2007. In those years, the Theater staged the following operas directed by Grigorian: Verdi "La Traviata", Tigranyan "Anush", "David Beck" Chukhajyan "Arshak II". During the years of leadership of Grigorian, the Theater staged such operas of directors invited by Grigorian as  "Carmen", "Norma", "Aleko", "Don Juan"  The concert version included the following operas: Tchaikovsky "Iolanta",  Mozart "The Magic Flute", Vivaldi "Tigran the Great". The following ballets were performed: Aram Khachaturyan "Gayane" M.Mavisakalyan - L. Tchgnavoryan "Saint Hripsime and Trdat," Shchedrin "Carmen - Suite".

Bellini's "Norma" was filmed in the pagan temple of Garni with the artistic staff of theater, (Director: Boris Hayrapetyan (Russia), production of Spendiaryan Opera and Ballet Theater and Union of Cinematographers of Russia).
From 2015 at the request of the President of Armenia Serzh Sargsyan and the troupe of the Opera House, Gegham Grigorian returned to the National Academic Theater of Opera and Ballet as artistic director.

Grigoryan gave master classes to many students from Armenia, Russia, Ukraine, Lithuania, Georgia, USA, Canada, Syria and other countries.  He died in Yerevan, aged 65.

Recordings 

By order of Philips Classics Records,  Gegham Grigorian has recorded the following operas:

War and Peace by Prokofiev, 
The Queen of Spades by Tchaikovsky  
Iolanta by Tchaikovsky  
Prince Igor by Borodin
Sadko by Rimsky-Korsakov 
La Forza del Destino by Verdi

Filmography 

The Queen of Spades (St. Petersburg, the Mariinsky Theatre), 
War and Peace (production of the Mariinsky Theater and Covent Garden, the director - Grenvik)
War and Peace  (production of the Mariinsky Theater, the Metropolitan, La Scala, the director - Kanchalovsky), 
Sadko 
La Forza del Destino La Force du Destin - Version 1862 (Théâtre Mariinsky 1998) - La Forza del Destino - Critique DVD 
Almast 1985 Armenfilm
Arshak 2nd 1988 Armenfilm
Norma

Awards and recognition 

Honored Artist of Lithuania (1982)
People's Artist of the Republic of Armenia (1985)
The owner of Medal of Movses Horenatsi (2006)
The owner of the first degree medal for his services to his country (2011)
1982 - Laureate of the Tchaikovsky Competition
1975 - Winner of the contest Glinka
1972 - Winner of the contest of musicians Caucasus
1970 - Winner of the contest Spendiaryan

External links

 Gegam Grigorian, opera singer - obituary
 MusicalAmerica - Subscriber Login
 Скончался Гегам Григорян | OperaNews.ru
 Գեղամ Գրիգորյան
LA FORZA DEL DESTINO, Verdi: Gegam Grigorian as Don Alvaro

1951 births
2016 deaths
Musicians from Yerevan
People's Artists of Armenia
Komitas State Conservatory of Yerevan alumni
20th-century Armenian male opera singers
Operatic tenors